The Colombian Coast Guard is the coastal defense, search and rescue, and maritime law enforcement branch of the Military Forces of Colombia. Equipped with modern electronic surveillance and location systems at land stations, the Coast Guard covers the Caribbean and Pacific coasts and focuses on the repression of crime at sea, the control of the preservation of the marine environment and search and rescue operations.<ref name="undefined"

The National Navy, through the Coast Guard, is a military maritime service which performs public safety and environmental functions, as well as protecting economic interests in the maritime areas under its jurisdiction, including the coasts, ports and internal waters of the country. Its characteristic mix of military capabilities, defence and support in humanitarian assistance operations, serves the country in five main functions, which are: sea safety, sea control, sea transit and MIOs.

History
Decree 1874 of August 2, 1979 signed by the President of the Republic of Colombia, created the Coast Guard dependent on the National Navy, with functions within marine waters jurisdictions. 

Since then, the Coast Guard, which depends on the National Navy, has a Command, a Maritime Safety Department and an Administrative Department.

It also has 13 units afloat, manned by 171 men, operating in the Colombian Atlantic. They are responsible for ensuring maritime security and the interests of the nation in the areas of jurisdiction.

In 1993, the Coast Guard activated a Command in the Pacific to attend simultaneously to both seas and thus fulfill its functions of defense of national sovereignty, control of fishing, repression of contraband, search and rescue, protection of the marine environment and natural resources.

In addition to these functions, the Coast Guard controls illegal migration and immigration, collaborates with oceanographic and hydrographic investigations, protects the nation's renewable and non-renewable resources, controls maritime traffic and supports government and private activities at sea.

In this way, the Coast Guard Component of the National Navy not only fulfills its philosophy of serving humanity to protect life at sea, but also contributes to the defense of the country and the maintenance of public order. 

Drug trafficking was a challenge to the State by breaking laws and questioning its existence, as the money generated by illegal trade financed terrorist actions while encouraging the smuggling of arms, ammunition and explosives. 

In view of the difficult situation, the Colombian government issued Presidential Directive No. 05 of 28 December 1991, a policy to combat the various agents that generate violence, such as drug trafficking and guerrillas, seeking to "reduce the high crime rates, reduce social violence and develop far-reaching measures to ensure public peace".8 The government has also taken steps to improve the situation of the population, including the protection of the environment. 8 To this extent, one of the priorities was to attack all links of drug trafficking, an issue for which the strengthening of the National Navy and the Air Force was deemed necessary, which would consequently lead to the organization and activation of the Coast Guard.

It is clear, then, that the issue of drug trafficking would determine the staging of the Coast Guard, setting this body and the National Navy the course they should take: closing spaces to drug trafficking and exercising total control and dominion over the sea.

Functions
The general functions of the Coast Guard stations are to develop and carry out inspection programs for vessels and boats in general, to carry out search and rescue operations, and to conduct operations against illegal activities. 

Although the creation of the Coast Guard must fulfill specific functions in the national and international environment, by the time it is created it also responds to the initiative to guard maritime traffic, since it depends to a great extent on the impulse of a transnational economic opening suggested as a model for world economic development. The idea of defending an International Maritime Law, already raised in the many world congresses organized by the economic powers in the nineties of the last century, as well as strengthening the operational capacity of maritime traffic, are among the factors that accompany the creation and activation of the Coast Guard. The strengthening of a Naval Force is also understood in relation to the idea already mentioned. 

Furthermore, it is clear that for the development and maintenance of all this infrastructure, it was necessary to provide tools, that is, ships with larger and smaller units, airplanes for naval surveillance, and of course, the human component for their use. 

Similarly, the interest in guarding national maritime spaces: exclusive economic zone, continental platform, territorial sea; certainly originates the need to reinforce and consolidate in our geography a notion of conscience, which in concrete terms corresponds to a national maritime extension of 880,376 Km2 and which needs to be guarded since it means for the country a source of resources. 
On the other hand, the search for consolidating a Naval Power, whose objective is the protection of maritime interests, as well as a Maritime Power, which consists in the consolidation of the use of the maritime space; are two key elements that the Colombian State has to support in order to protect its maritime sovereignty. 

For the fulfillment of such objectives, the patrolling of the corresponding maritime spaces is key, a fact that also seeks to combat the illegal traffic that subsists within the structure of the Colombian State. In truth, this last point is the capacity in dissuasive and coercive terms that the State must have against those who try to break the security and order with illegality.  
The maritime interdiction component in the fight against maritime drug trafficking was, among other things, the bet to which the National Navy opted since the early years of the 21st century. Neutralizing the maritime communication routes of the drug traffickers, as well as submitting them to the courts, are among the tasks to safeguard the maritime sovereignty of the country. Indeed, the maritime agreement to suppress illicit trafficking signed by Colombia and the United States government in mid-February 1997, whose purpose is to carry out coordinated operations against drug trafficking, indicates a total of 375.13 tons of cocaine seized between 2001 and 2004, with 2003 being the year with the largest seizure of 113.62 tons.

The figures suggest that significant progress has been made against drug trafficking, and it is important to note that these seizures have been made thanks to the constant surveillance and control of maritime routes by the National Navy and the Coast Guard.

Bases
In the Caribbean, the places chosen to install the stations are Cartagena, Barranquilla, Santa Marta, Coveñas, Turbo, Riohacha, Puerto Bolivar (Guajira), Puerto Estrella, Castilletes, Sapzurro, San Andrés, Providencia and Serranilla.

On the other hand, the sites that will have coast guard stations on the Pacific coast will be: Buenaventura, Juradó, Bahía Solano, Nuquí, Bahía Málaga, Charambirá (mouths of the San Juan), Guapi, Gorgona, Malpelo, Tumaco and Cabo Manglares.

Equipment

Vessels

In keeping with its three major operational scenarios: blue-water operations, littoral/riverine operations and coast guard, the ARC maintains a mix of ships suited to each of those profiles. The scope of its operation has been historically oriented towards lightly armed coastal patrol, and as such, the majority of its vessels had been usually mid-size cutters. Traditionally, the ARC has had strong ties to the American and German navies and shipbuilders and much of its equipment traces its roots to them.

Aircraft

The Navy Aviation Command operates approximately 17 fixed and rotary wing aircraft for naval surveillance and patrol, Search and Rescue (SAR), and logistical support of naval facilities and operations.

Medal
With the aim of stimulating and rewarding outstanding Body, is created by Decree No. 399 of February 18, 1994, the Medal Distinguished Service to the Coast Guard. This would be made up in its central body by a blue malt cross finished off in its angles exterior by gold coloured spheres. "The cross contains a central circle that resembles a life jacket (a Coast Guard badge), the outer ring of which is red colour with gold trimmings. In the central part is the shield of the Coast Guard Corps meaning the motto to serve humanity by protecting the life.

See also
 Colombian Navy
 Coast guard
 Military Forces of Colombia

References

External links
 https://www.armada.mil.co/es/content/comando-de-guardacostas

Coast guards
Gendarmerie
Military of Colombia
Colombian Navy